The 2019 Arizona State Sun Devils football team represented Arizona State University in the 2019 NCAA Division I FBS football season. They were led by second-year head coach Herm Edwards and played their home games at Sun Devil Stadium.

Preseason

Pac-12 Media Days

Pac-12 media poll
In the 2019 Pac-12 preseason media poll, Arizona State was voted to finish tied for third place with UCLA in the South Division.

Offseason

Recruiting

Transfers

Outgoing

Incoming

2019 NFL draft

ASU players drafted into the NFL

Undrafted NFL free agents

Schedule
Arizona State will open its 2019 schedule with three non-conference games against Kent State of the Mid-American Conference, Sacramento State of the Big Sky Conference, and Michigan State of the Big Ten Conference. In Pac-12 Conference play, the Sun Devils will play the other members of the South Division and draws California, Oregon, Oregon State, and Washington State from the North Division.

Source:

Game summaries

Kent State

Sacramento State

at Michigan State

Colorado

at California

Washington State

at Utah

at UCLA

USC

at Oregon State

Oregon

Jayden Daniels broke Rudy Carpenter's record for passing yards in a season for a freshman quarterback.

Arizona

vs. Florida State (Sun Bowl)

Rankings

Personnel

Coaching staff

Roster

Depth chart
Starters and backups for Arizona State

True Freshman
Double Position : *

References

Arizona State
Arizona State Sun Devils football seasons
Sun Bowl champion seasons
Arizona State Sun Devils football